Alan B. Ford, FAIA, (born December 20, 1952) is an American architect and author best known for his work on K-12 sustainable schools.

A regular contributor to architectural journalism, Ford is author of Designing the Sustainable School and co-author of A Sense of Entry: Designing the Welcoming School. In 2008, Ford was a member of the national American Institute of Architects (AIA) Soloso (now Architect's Knowledge Resource) Editorial Content Review Board and subject matter expert for the website's design content. He has been published in such prominent journals as Architect Colorado and World Architecture News.

The best known works to which Ford has applied his architectural expertise are the Ronald Reagan Presidential Library (Donovan and Green) in Simi Valley, California; the Walt Disney World Swan resort hotel (Michael Graves with Alan Lapidus Architects) in Lake Buena Vista, Florida; and the Tycon Towers development (John Burgee Architects with Philip Johnson) in Vienna, Virginia.

Biography

Personal life 
Alan Ford was born on the Travis Air Force Base in California, where his father was stationed at the time. While growing up, Ford and his family were relocated to Alaska, Georgia and Florida.

By age six Ford had discovered and sought to develop his own creative talent through music. He cycled through various instruments and ultimately began playing guitar at the age of fourteen, which he continued into his twenties. Inspired by the 1970 Atlanta Pop Festival in Byron, Georgia, Ford went on to form the band Nothing (later renamed Free Form). From 1970 to 1972, Alan performed as a professional musician with his band. He began as a rhythm guitarist, often providing backup vocals, but later assumed the role of lead guitarist with occasional spots as lead vocalist.

In 1973, Ford parted from his band and moved to Boulder, Colorado in pursuit of a career in the recording industry. However, upon an unsuccessful attempt at securing a job with a Boulder-based recording studio, he began working at a dental supply company to save money for college.

Ford earned a Bachelor of Environmental Design from the University of Colorado at Boulder in 1978 and a Master of Architecture from the University of Colorado Denver in 1980.

Alan Ford is now married with a wife and two kids. They live in an 1896-built Victorian home in Denver’s Park Hill neighborhood. In 2000, Ford and his wife (also an architect) designed their own remodel of the house, which consisted of an  addition that received widespread media acclaim. The renovation also earned a 2003 Architect’s Choice Award, sponsored by the Rocky Mountain News, the American Institute of Architects’ Denver chapter and the city and county of Denver.

Career 
Upon receiving his Master of Architecture in 1980, Ford landed a job with W.C. Muchow and Partners Architects in Denver, where he remained for three years. In 1984, Ford moved to New York City where he joined the office of John Burgee Architects and Philip Johnson. He later went on to do work for Alan Lapidus/Michael Graves in 1989, I. M. Pei & Partners in 1990 and Kohn Pedersen Fox Associates in 1991. Alan attributes the cultivation of his fervor forarchitecture – which materialized in the form of architectural journalism – to the inspiration he found in Philip Johnson's passion for the profession.

In 1993, Ford co-founded Hutton Ford Architects P.C. with Paul Hutton, where he was a managing principal until 2007. On June 1, 2007, in a move to diversify his firm's range of services, Ford established Alan Ford Architects P.C.; however, both he and Hutton continue to collaborate on a number of joint ventures under the entity Hutton Ford Architects, LLC.

Alan Ford continues to practice as a licensed Colorado architect and principal of Alan Ford Architects. He authored the book Designing the Sustainable School and co-authored A Sense of Entry: Designing the Welcoming School with former partner Paul Hutton. In addition to his interest in K-12 sustainable school design, Ford has a passion for masonry detailing, which is evidenced by his Park Hill residence and a significant number of past projects.

Ford has served on the editorial board of the award-winning AIA magazine Architect Colorado, and as an honorarium professor and guest critic at the University of Colorado, School of Architecture. He is also the former subject matter expert/editor of design content for the national AIA Soloso website (now the Architect's Knowledge Resource), where he regularly contributed content promoting sustainability, design innovations and the architectural profession.

Alan Ford Architects P.C.
Alan Ford Architects P.C. is a Colorado architecture firm based in the unique Taxi2 development within the River North Art District in Denver. The firm was founded in 2007 by Alan Ford, who had been a design and managing partner with Hutton Ford Architects. Alan Ford Architects specializes in the design of high-performance, sustainable K-12 schools, but also has extensive experience in a variety of additional project types including office, retail and mixed-use developments; performing arts facilities; single family and multifamily residential; and sports and fitness centers.

Professional affiliations 
American Institute of Architects (AIA)
City Club of Denver Board of Directors 1999-2002
Council of Educational Facility Planners, International (CEFPI)
National Council of Architectural Registration Boards (NCARB)
State of Colorado Architect License

Notable aspects of career 
Author: Designing the Sustainable School, The Images Publishing Group, 2007
Co-Author: A Sense of Entry: Designing the Welcoming School, The Images Publishing Group, 2007Member: National AIA Soloso (now Architect's Knowledge Resource) Editorial Content Review Board; Subject Matter Expert for design content, 2008
AIA Colorado, Design Conference Committee Member, 2003, 2006, 2007
Architect Colorado Editorial Board, 2005–2007
City Club Board Member, 2001–2002
Guest Lecturer, University of Colorado, 2007
Instructor, University of Colorado at Boulder, School of Architecture, 1997
Instructor, University of Colorado Denver, School of Architecture, 1998–99
Juror, University of Colorado, College of Architecture and Planning, 1997

Significant works 
Mapleton Elementary School Conversion to Early Childhood Center
Robert E. Loup Jewish Community Center Master Plan
Staunton State Park Master Plan
Spruce Street Place Mixed-use Development
Cherokee Ranch Ethics Institute and Conference Facility
Fort Lupton School District 2001 Bond Issue
Lowry Office Building
Morgan Stanley Southwest Region Office and Conference Facility
Ault Administrative Office and Conference Building, Weld County School
Ohio State University Classroom Building (designer with Philip Johnson Architect)
Joliet Learning Center
1055 Lincoln Green Office Building
Mead Middle School Gymnasium
Kent Denver Science and Technology Center
Alexander Dawson Performing Arts Center
Green Mountain High School
Drake Middle School
Tycon Center, Fairfax County, Virginia

References

External links
Alan Ford Architects Official Website
Archiplanet: Alan Ford Architects P.C.
Designing the Sustainable School (Hardcover), Amazon.com
A Sense of Entry: Designing the Welcoming School (Hardcover), Amazon.com
World Architecture News article by Alan Ford
AIA Architect's Knowledge Resource
The American Institute of Architects
Philip Johnson Alan Ritchie Architects
Kohn Pedersen Fox Associates
Michael Graves & Associates
Pei Cobb Freed & Partners Architects

Architects from Colorado
Living people
1952 births
University of Colorado Denver alumni
People from Solano County, California